The 1887 Port Chalmers by-election was a by-election held on 6 April 1887 in the  electorate during the 9th New Zealand Parliament.

The by-election was caused by the death on 11 February of the incumbent MP James Macandrew.

The by-election was won by James Mills. As he was the only candidate nominated, he was declared duly elected.

References

Port Chalmers, 1887
1887 elections in New Zealand
Politics of Otago
April 1887 events